Chilli crab (Malay: Ketam cili) is a Southeast Asian seafood dish that originated in Singapore in the 1960s. It is widely associated as the national cuisines of both Malaysia and Singapore. Mud crabs are commonly used and are stir-fried in a semi-thick, sweet and savoury tomato-and-chilli-based sauce.

Origins
In 1956, Cher Yam Tian and her husband Lim Choo Ngee began selling stir-fried crabs mixed with bottled chilli and tomato sauce from a pushcart. This was an improvised recipe; the original one did not involve bottled chilli sauce. A successful business selling this dish prompted the establishment of a restaurant, Palm Beach Seafood, along Upper East Coast Road. The version most widespread today was created by Hooi Kok Wah in the 1960s, one of four famous Singapore chefs during the era.

In September 2009, Ng Yen Yen, Malaysia's Tourism Minister, claimed that, among other dishes, "chilli crab is Malaysian", accusing "other countries" of "hijacking our food".

Description
Chilli crab sauce is described as "sensuous" and "sweet, yet savoury", with a "fluffy texture". Mud crabs (Scylla serrata) are the most common type of crabs used for the dish, although other species of crab can also be used.

It is commonly served with a side of either fried or steamed mantou buns, which are used to scoop up the sauce.

Cultural impact
CNN Go listed chilli crab as one of the "world's 50 most delicious foods", at Number 35. Michelin inspectors dedicate a page to chilli crab on their website.

The Amazing Race 25, The Amazing Race Asia 4, and The Amazing Race China 4 featured a task that required contestants to crack a specified amount of chilli crabs. Chilli crab was also featured on the Netflix TV series Street Food in season 1.

See also 

 Black pepper crab
 List of crab dishes
 List of seafood dishes
 Oyster sauce crab
 Crab in Padang sauce

References

Singaporean cuisine
Malaysian cuisine
Crab dishes
National dishes